{{Infobox airport
| name                = PAF Base Minhas
| commander           =  
Air Commodore
Agha mehr gul
| nativename          = 
| nativename-a        = 
| nativename-r        = 
| image               = File:PAF Base Minhas.jpg
| image-width         = 250
| caption             = Logo of PAF Base Minhas
| IATA                = MNS
| ICAO                = OPMS
| type                = Military
| owner               = Government of Pakistan
| operator            = Pakistan Air Force
| city-served         = 
| location            = Attock
| occupants           = Pakistan Air Force
 No. 3 Squadron "Angels"
 No. 15 Squadron "Cobras"
 No. 16 Squadron "Black Panthers"
 No. 87 Squadron "Dragonflies"
| elevation-f         = 1023
| elevation-m         = 312
| coordinates         = 
| website             = 
| metric-elev         = 
| metric-rwy          = 
| r1-number           = 12/30
| r1-length-f         = 9,950
| r1-length-m         = 3,033
| r1-surface          = Asphalt
| stat-year           = 
| stat1-header        = 
| stat1-data          = 
| stat2-header        = 
| stat2-data          = 
| footnotes           = 
}}

Minhas Airbase or Kamra Airbase  is a PAF Airbase located at Attock District, Punjab, Pakistan. It was named in the honour of Pilot Officer Rashid Minhas, who was awarded the Nishan-e-Haider for valor in the Indo-Pakistani War of 1971. Pakistan Aeronautical Complex is located in Minhas Airbase which manufactures aircraft like CAC/PAC JF-17 Thunder, PAC MFI-17 Mushshak, Hongdu JL-8. It also rebuilds aircraft like the Dassault Mirage and Chengdu F-7''.

2012 terrorist attack
On 16 August 2012, nine Tehrik-e-Taliban militants assaulted PAF Base Minhas at about 2 am. After a pitched battle all nine attackers were killed while two Pakistani security officials also died. The base commander, Air Commodore Muhammad Azam, was reported wounded in the attack as well. The militants also destroyed one Saab 2000 Erieye plane and damaged one or two others.

See also
Rashid Minhas

References

External links
Airport information for Minhas Airbase at World Aero Data

Pakistan Air Force bases
Attock District
Military installations in Punjab, Pakistan